Perittia antauges is a moth of the family Elachistidae. It is found in Western Australia.

The wingspan is 8.8–10.9 mm for males. The forewings are creamy white and the hindwings are pale grey.

References

Moths described in 2011
Elachistidae
Moths of Australia